Vermontia is a monotypic genus of sheet weavers containing the single species, Vermontia thoracica. It was first described by Alfred Frank Millidge in 1984, and is found in Canada, the United States, and Russia.

See also
 List of Linyphiidae species (Q–Z)

References

Linyphiidae
Monotypic Araneomorphae genera
Spiders of North America
Spiders of Russia